50 Cent (born 1975) is an American rapper.

50 Cent may also refer to:
 Kelvin Martin (1964–1987), criminal from the Bronx, New York known as 50 Cent
 50 Cent Party, groups of Chinese netizens allegedly paid by the Chinese government to promote the policies of the Chinese Communist Party
 50 CENT, a song by Dean Blunt from the album Black Metal

See also
50 cents, coins valued at 50 cents in decimal currency systems